Centigon may refer to:

Centigon (unit), a unit of plane angle, the hundredth part of a gon (gradian).
Centigon (company), a company specializing in security products like armored vehicles